Wants You! is the second album of the band Rough Cutt.  On certain versions/portions of the album, the full title appears as Rough Cutt Wants You!, as opposed to simply Wants You!.

Producer Jack Douglas also worked with Cheap Trick, Aerosmith on Rocks, Toys in the Attic and Draw the Line, and on John Lennon's last record, Double Fantasy.

Track listing
 Side one
 "Rock the USA" (Chris Hager, Matt Thorr, Paul Shortino, Dave Alford) - 2:58
 "Bad Reputation" (Amir Derakh, Thorr, Alford) - 3:43
 "Don't Settle for Less" (Hager, Shortino, Thorr, Alford) - 2:33
 "Hot 'n' Heavy" (Hager, Derakh, Shortino, Thorr, Alford) - 4:46
 "Take a Chance" (Hager, Derakh, Shortino, Thorr, Alford) - 4:04

Side two
 "We Like It Loud" (Hager, Derakh, Shortino, Thorr, Alford) - 3:58
 "Double Trouble" (Hager, Derakh, Shortino, Thorr, Alford) - 3:44
 "You Wanna Be a Star" (Hager, Derakh, Shortino, Thorr, Alford) - 2:44
 "Let 'em Talk" (Hager, Shortino, Thorr) - 3:35
 "The Night Cries Out (for You)" (Hager, Derakh, Shortino, Thorr, Alford) - 4:52

Personnel
 Band members
 Paul Shortino – lead vocals
 Amir Derakh – guitars, synthesizers
 Chris Hager – guitars
 Matt Thorr – bass
 Dave Alford – drums, backing vocals

Production
Jack Douglas - producer
Jay Messina - engineer, mixing at The Record Plant, New York City
Karat Faye, Jeff Bennett, Peter Arata - assistant engineers
George Marino - mastering at Sterling Sound, New York City

References

Rough Cutt albums
1986 albums
Albums produced by Jack Douglas (record producer)
Warner Records albums